Hugh M. Caldwell (June 7, 1881 – January 29, 1955) was an American politician who served as the Mayor of Seattle from 1920 to 1922.

References

1881 births
1955 deaths
Mayors of Seattle
Washington (state) Republicans